William Key  was a Scottish footballer who played as a right half.

Career
Born in Glasgow, Key played club football for Vale of Clyde, Queen's Park and St Mirren, and made one appearance for Scotland in 1907.

Personal life
His brother George was also a Scotland international.

References

Year of birth missing
Year of death missing
Scottish footballers
Scotland international footballers
Queen's Park F.C. players
St Mirren F.C. players
Association football wing halves
Place of death missing
Scottish Football League players
Scottish Junior Football Association players
Scotland junior international footballers
Vale of Clyde F.C. players